Cornisepta verenae is a species of sea snail, a marine gastropod mollusk in the family Fissurellidae, the keyhole limpets.

Description
The shell grows to a height of 1.6 mm.

Distribution
This marine species occurs off the Juan de Fuca Ridge, northeast Pacific Ocean. It lives at a depth of 1,530 m.

References

 McLean J.H. & Geiger D.L. (1998). New genera and species having the Fissurisepta shell form, with a generic-level phylogenetic analysis (Gastropoda: Fissurellidae). Contributions in Science, Natural History Museum of Los Angeles County 475: 1–32

External links
 

Fissurellidae
Gastropods described in 1998